Lomalito Moala is a Tongan Australian boxer who has represented Tonga at the Commonwealth Games. He won a Bronze medal at the 2010 Commonwealth Games.

Moala was born in New Zealand and grew up in Lower Hutt, but moved to Australia in 2005 at the age of 15.

He competed in the 2010 Commonwealth games in New Delhi, winning bronze in the lightweight class.  In 2012 he was part of the Tongan team at the Oceania Boxing Championships. He failed to qualify for the 2012 Summer Olympic Games by a single point.

He was selected for the Tongan team for the 2014 Commonwealth Games in Glasgow. In the leadup to the opening ceremony he tweeted that he would wear the shirt of football club Celtic F.C. if retweeted a hundred times. He kept his promising at the opening ceremony, attracting media attention and the ire of Tongan fans. The next day, he failed to make the weigh-in and so was not able to compete.

Moala now runs a boxing academy in Sydney.

References

Living people
2000 births
Australian sportspeople of Tongan descent
Boxers at the 2010 Commonwealth Games
Commonwealth Games competitors for Tonga
Commonwealth Games bronze medallists for Tonga
Sportspeople from Lower Hutt
Commonwealth Games medallists in boxing
Medallists at the 2010 Commonwealth Games